The European Racquetball Tour (ERT) is composed by several racquetball tournaments in Europe. It was established in 1999 and is promoted by the European Racquetball Federation.

2017–2018 season

2014–2015 season

 Satellite level

2009–2010 season

 Satellite level

2008–2009 season

2007–2008 season

References

Racquetball competitions
Sports competition series